Omphalotropis rubens is a species of minute, salt marsh snail with an operculum, aquatic gastropod mollusk, or micromollusk, a terrestrial gastropod mollusk in the family Assimineidae.

Distribution 
This terrestrial species occurs in Réunion and Mauritius.

References

 Griffiths, O.L. & Florens, V.F.B. (2006). A field guide to the non-marine molluscs of the Mascarene Islands (Mauritius, Rodrigues and Réunion) and the northern dependencies of Mauritius. Bioculture Press: Mauritius. Pp. i–xv, 1–185.

External links
 Quoy J.R.C. & Gaimard J.P. (1832-1835). Voyage de découvertes de l'"Astrolabe" exécuté par ordre du Roi, pendant les années 1826-1829, sous le commandement de M. J. Dumont d'Urville. Zoologie. 1: i-l, 1-264; 2(1): 1-321 [1832; 2(2): 321-686 [1833]; 3(1): 1-366 [1834]; 3(2): 367-954 [1835]; Atlas (Mollusques): pls 1-93 [1833]. Paris: Tastu]
 Deshayes G.P. (1832-1833). Mollusques. In: Bélanger, C. (ed.) Voyage aux Indes-Orientales, par le nord de l'Europe, les provinces du Caucase, la Géorgie, l'Arménie et la Perse, suivi de détails topographiques, statistiques et autres sur le Pégou, les îles de Java, de Maurice et de Bourbon, sur le Cap-de-Bonne-Espérance et Sainte-Hélène, pendant les années 1825, 1826, 1827, 1828 et 1829. Volume 2, Zoologie: 403-416 [1832, 417-440 [1833], 3 pls [1833 or 1834]. Paris: Arthus Bertran]
 Pfeiffer, L. (1847). Uebersicht aller bekannten Arten von Cyclostomaceen. Zeitschrift für Malakozoologie. 4(7): 101-112
 Deshayes G.P. (1863). Catalogue des mollusques de l'île de la Réunion (Bourbon). Pp. 1-144. In Maillard, L. (Ed.) Notes sur l'Ile de la Réunion. Dentu, Paris,

Assimineidae